Justice Daniel refers to Peter Vivian Daniel, associate justice of the Supreme Court of the United States. Justice Daniel may also refer to:

Joseph J. Daniel, associate justice of the North Carolina Supreme Court
Price Daniel, associate justice of the Texas Supreme Court
William Daniel (judge), associate justice of the Virginia Supreme Court of Appeals

See also
Justice Daniels (disambiguation)